Qepchaq (also Romanized as Qepchāq) is a village in Chah Dasht Rural District, Shara District, Hamadan County, Hamadan Province, Iran. At the 2006 census, its population was 181, in 41 families.

References 

Populated places in Hamadan County